Yosef Avraham haLevi Heller is an Orthodox rabbi and a member of the Chabad Hasidic movement. Rabbi Heller serves as an emeritus member of the Bais Din Tzedek (Jewish Rabbinical Court) of the Chabad community in Crown Heights, Brooklyn; he is an authority on Halacha (Jewish law) and Hasidic philosophy. Rabbi Heller holds the additional position of Rosh Kollel, head of the community's kollel, a yeshiva for married men.

Rabbi of Crown Heights

As a member of the Crown Heights Beth Din (rabbinical court), Rabbi Heller is considered  one of the community's chief rabbis (Aramaic, מרא דאתרא (Marah D'Asra)). The rabbinical court is the spiritual and religious body governing the Crown Heights Chabad community. There are currently three rabbis serving on the Beth Din:
Rabbi Avraham Osdoba
Rabbi Yosef Heller
Rabbi Yosef Braun

Each hold the title Marah D'Asra.

The Crown Heights rabbinical court is funded by the Va'ad Hakohol of Crown Heights, a religious corporation representing the Jewish community of Crown Heights.

Appointment
Rabbi Heller, along with Rabbis Yehuda Kalmen Marlow and Avraham Osdoba, was elected to the rabbinical court in a communal election, following the passing of Rabbi Zalman Shimon Dvorkin, the community's previous chief rabbi. After the passing of his wife Rabbi Heller stopped most public rabbinic activities, he still however answers rabbinic questions privately, as well as in the Kolel.

Rosh Kollel
Rabbi Heller holds the additional position of Rosh Kollel, head of the community's kollel, a yeshiva for married men.

In Orthodox Judaism, it is customary for every community to establish a communal institution where a group of adult men study during the day. The men are in turn supported financially by the community.

Statements on Jewish Law
Rabbi Heller has publicly stated that stringencient practices in Jewish Law (or chumras), may not be practiced if they are at the expense of other members of one's household. Heller referred to practices common in Orthodox circles, where additional stringencies are practiced on Passover.

References

External links
CHJCC directory for the Beth Din

Living people
21st-century American rabbis
American Hasidic rabbis
Chabad-Lubavitch rabbis
Year of birth missing (living people)